Julius Caesar (100–44 BC) was a Roman general and dictator.

Caesar or Cæsar may also refer to:

Places
 Caesar, Zimbabwe
 Caesar Creek State Park, in southwestern Ohio

People
 Caesar (given name)
 Caesar (surname)
 Caesar (title), a title used by Roman and Byzantine emperors, and also at times by Ottoman emperors, derived from the dictator's name
 Augustus (63 BC – 14 AD), adoptive son of the dictator and first Roman emperor
 Other members of the Julii Caesares, the family from which the dictator came
 Gaius Julius Caesar (proconsul) (140–85 BC), father of the dictator
 Claudius, fourth Roman emperor, first bearer of the name Claudius Caesar
 Nero, fifth Roman emperor, second bearer of the name Claudius Caesar
 Caesar of Dyrrhachium, 1st-Century Bishop
 Bernhard Caesar Einstein (1930–2008), Swiss-American physicist and grandson of Albert Einstein
 Caesar the Geezer (born 1958), British radio personality

Art and entertainment

Fictional characters
 Caesar (Planet of the Apes)
 Caesar (Xena), in Xena: Warrior Princess
 Caesar, the leader of Caesar's Legion in Fallout
 King Caesar, a monster in the Godzilla series
 Malik Caesar, in the video game Tales of Graces
 Caesar Flickerman, in The Hunger Games
 Caesar Salazar, in Cartoon Network's Generator Rex
 Caesar Anthonio Zeppeli, in the manga Jojo's Bizarre Adventure: Battle Tendency

Literature
 Caesar (McCullough novel), a 1998 novel by Colleen McCullough
 Caesar (Massie novel), a 1993 novel by Allan Massie
 Caesar, Life of a Colossus, a 2006 biography of Julius Caesar by Adrian Goldsworthy

Music
 Caesar (band), a Dutch indie rock band
 Caesars (band), a Swedish garage rock band
 "Caesar" (song), a 2010 song by I Blame Coco
 "Caesar", a 1993 song by Iggy Pop from American Caesar

Other uses in art and entertainment
 Caesar (Mercury Theatre), 1937 stage production of Orson Welles's Mercury Theatre
 Caesar (game), a 1977 board wargame that simulates the Battle of Alesia
 Caesar (video game), a 1992 city-building computer game
 Caesar!, a British series of radio plays by Mike Walker
 The Caesars (TV series), a 1968 British television series
Dr.Caesar Salazar, supporting character of 2010 Cartoon Network showGenerator Rex,  in which he is the title character's long-lost elder brother

Brands and enterprises
 Caesar Film, an Italian film company of the silent era
 Caesars Entertainment (2020), a hotel and casino operator, among whose properties include:
 Caesars Atlantic City, New Jersey, US
 Caesars Palace, Las Vegas, Nevada, US
 Caesars Southern Indiana, Elizabeth, Indiana, US
 Caesars Tahoe, now MontBleu, Stateline, Nevada, US
 Caesars Windsor, Ontario, Canada

Food and drinks
 Caesar (cocktail), a Canadian cocktail
 Caesar salad
Caesar's, Tijuana restaurant and birthplace of the eponymous salad
 Little Caesars, a pizza chain

Military
 CAESAR self-propelled howitzer, a French artillery gun
 HMS Caesar, several ships of the Royal Navy
 Operation Caesar, a German World War II mission

Science and technology
 CAESAR (spacecraft), a proposed NASA sample-return mission to comet 67P/Churyumov-Gerasimenko
 Caesar cipher, an encryption technique
 Caesarean section (often simply called "a caesar"), surgically assisted birth procedure
 Center of Advanced European Studies and Research
 Clean And Environmentally Safe Advanced Reactor, a nuclear reactor design
 Committee for the Scientific Examination of Religion
 Ctgf/hcs24 CAESAR, a cis-acting RNA element
 Euroradar CAPTOR, a radar system

Other uses
 Caesar (dog), a fox terrier owned by King Edward VII
 Caesar (ship), three merchant ships and a privateer
 Caesar cut, a hairstyle
 Nottingham Caesars, an American football team

See also

 Given name
 Cesar (disambiguation)
 Cesare (disambiguation)
 Qaisar
 Title
 Kaiser (disambiguation)
 Kayser (disambiguation)
 Keiser (disambiguation)
 Czar (disambiguation)
 Tsar (disambiguation)
 Caesarea (disambiguation)
 Julius Caesar (disambiguation)
 Giulio Cesare (disambiguation)
 Julio Cesar (disambiguation)
 Little Caesar (disambiguation)
 Seasar, open source application framework